Ponnambalam Coomaraswamy (7 December 1849 – 7 June 1906) was a Ceylon Tamil lawyer and member of the Legislative Council of Ceylon.

Early life and family

Coomaraswamy was born on 7 December 1849. He was the son of Gate Mudaliyar A. Ponnambalam. He was the brother of P. Ramanathan and P. Arunchalam.

Coomaraswamy was educated at Colombo Academy, Colombo and Presidency College, Madras.

Career
Coomaraswamy joined the legal profession after finishing his education.

Coomaraswamy was a member of Colombo Municipal Council from January 1873 to October 1879 and from November 1885 to December 1889. He was appointed to the Legislative Council of Ceylon in 1893 as the unofficial member representing Tamils, replacing his brother Ramanathan.

Coomaraswamy was a Tamil scholar and a publisher of Tamil literature. He was president of Jaffna Saiva Paripalana Sabai and helped establish Jaffna Hindu College. He also established a Hindu temple on Slave Island.

Coomaraswamy died on 7 June 1906 in Colombo.

References

1849 births
1906 deaths
Alumni of Royal College, Colombo
Colombo municipal councillors
P
Members of the Legislative Council of Ceylon
Mudaliyars of Ceylon
People from British Ceylon
Presidency College, Chennai alumni
Sri Lankan Tamil lawyers
Sri Lankan Tamil politicians